Tabanlıoğlu Architects (Turkish: Tabanlıoğlu Mimarlık) is an architectural firm based in Istanbul. The practice is led by Murat Tabanlıoğlu, Melkan Tabanlıoğlu and Özdem Gürsel.

Project list
Major projects, by year of completion and ordered by type, are:

Cultural 
 1977: Atatürk Cultural Center, Istanbul, Turkey
 2004: İstanbul Modern (Istanbul Museum of Modern Art), Istanbul, Turkey

High rise
 2011: Istanbul Sapphire, Istanbul, Turkey

Shopping mall
 1986: Galleria Ataköy, Istanbul, Turkey
 2006: Kanyon Shopping Mall, Istanbul (with Jerde Partnership)

Sport
 2009: Astana Arena, Nur-Sultan, Kazakhstan

Transportation
 1984: Atatürk Airport, Istanbul, Turkey
 1998: Milas–Bodrum Airport, Bodrum, Turkey
 2017: Nur-Sultan-Nurly Jol, Astana, Kazakhstan

Awards
 2011: RIBA International Award (with Loft Gardens project)

Selected works

Notes

External links 
 Tabanlioglu Architects Website

Design companies established in 1956
Architecture firms of Turkey
Companies based in Istanbul
Turkish companies established in 1956